Roger Allers (born June 29, 1949) is an American film director, screenwriter, animator, storyboard artist, and playwright. He is best-known for co-directing The Lion King (1994), the highest-grossing traditionally animated film of all time, and for writing the Broadway adaptation of the same name. He also directed Sony Pictures Animation's first feature-length animated film, Open Season (2006) and the animated adaptation of The Prophet.

Life and career

Early life
Born in Rye, New York, but raised in Scottsdale, Arizona, Allers became a fan of animation, at the age of five, after seeing Disney's Peter Pan (1953). Deciding that he wanted to pursue a career in animation, and even work alongside Walt Disney himself, a few years later, he sent off to Disneyland for a do-it-yourself animation kit. However, Allers, by then a high school student, grew discouraged about achieving his dream when he had heard of Disney's death in 1966.

Despite not getting the chance to meet Walt Disney, Allers still pressed on to receive a Fine Arts degree from Arizona State University. However, when he attended a class at Harvard University, he realized that his interest in animation had been revitalized. After receiving his degree in Fine Arts, he spent the next two years traveling and living in Greece. While there, he spent some time living in a cave, and eventually met Leslee, whom he later married. As a young adult, Allers accepted a job with Lisberger Studios, where he worked as an animator for projects such as Sesame Street, The Electric Company, Make a Wish, and various other commercials.

In 1978, he relocated to Los Angeles with Steven Lisberger to work on a feature film titled Animalympics (1980) to which he provided story work, character design and animation for the film. Three years later, Allers found work serving as part of the storyboard team for Tron, which was the first theatrical feature film he worked on. In 1980, Allers and his family moved to Toronto, Canada, where he worked for Nelvana Studios as an animator on a feature titled Rock & Rule (1983). Following a brief return to Los Angeles, Allers provided character design, preliminary animation, and story development for the Japanese-produced animated feature, Little Nemo: Adventures in Slumberland (1989). For the next two years, he resided in Tokyo to serve as an animation director overseeing the Japanese artists.

Disney
Returning to Los Angeles in 1985, he heard that Disney was looking for a storyboard artist to work on Oliver & Company (1988). When he applied for the job, Allers was asked to draw some sample character model sheets as a tryout, and worked on a portfolio. He was hired shortly thereafter. Since then, he served as a storyboard artist on The Little Mermaid (1989), The Prince and the Pauper (1990), and The Rescuers Down Under (1990). For Beauty and the Beast (1991), he was appointed as Head of Story, leading a team of story artists to illustrate sketches from Linda Woolverton's screenplay. When Beauty and the Beast was nearly finished, Allers joined the King of the Jungle project as a director alongside George Scribner. He temporarily left the project to help storyboard sequences for Aladdin (1992).

In October 1991, Allers rejoined King of the Jungle, in which he brought on board Brenda Chapman, who would become the film's Head of Story. Afterwards, several of the lead crew members, including Allers, Scribner, Chapman, and production designer Chris Sanders, took a safari trip to  Kenya, in order to study and gain an appreciation of the environment for the film. After six months of story development work, Scribner decided to leave the project, as he disagreed with the decision to turn the film into a musical, as Scribner's intention was to make a documentary-like film more focused on natural aspects. Following Scribner's departure, and dissatisfied with the original story, Allers along with Hahn, Sanders, Chapman, and Beauty and the Beast directors Kirk Wise and Gary Trousdale conceived a new story outline for the film over the course of two days in February 1992. In April 1992, Allers was joined with Rob Minkoff who was assigned as co-director, and the title was changed to The Lion King (1994).

Following the release of The Lion King (1994), Allers and writer Matthew Jacobs conceived the idea of Kingdom of the Sun, and development on the project went underway in 1994. Meanwhile, Disney Theatrical Group had begun production on the Broadway musical adaptation of The Lion King as they had done with Beauty and the Beast (1994). At first skeptical, Allers joined the Broadway production team, and together with Lion King co-screenwriter Irene Mecchi, they wrote the libretto. At the 52nd Tony Awards, both Allers and Mecchi were nominated for the Tony Award for Best Book of a Musical. The musical itself won the Tony Award for Best Musical. 

After nearly four years on Kingdom of the Sun, Allers was decided to leave the project due to creative differences with Peter Schneider, head of animation at Disney. Ultimately, the project was reworked into The Emperor's New Groove (2000), and Allers left to work on Lilo & Stitch (2002) as a story artist. In 2001, he was approached by Hahn to direct the short film, The Little Matchgirl (2006). The project underwent about two years of work, as it was planned to be attached with the proposed Fantasia 2006 film, and was accompanied as a bonus feature on The Little Mermaid Platinum Edition DVD.

Meanwhile, Allers pitched the Celtic folk ballad tale Tam Lin to Michael Eisner, who at the time was in a corporate struggle with Roy E. Disney. Once Eisner recognized the project was Disney's "baby", he declined to green-light the project.

Post-Disney
In May 2003, it was announced that Allers and Brenda Chapman would direct Tam Lin for Sony Pictures Animation. However, one year later, Allers was recruited as an additional director on Open Season (2006) alongside director Jill Culton and co-director Anthony Stacchi, featuring the voice talents of Martin Lawrence and Ashton Kutcher.

In January 2012, it was announced that Allers will oversee the narrative structure, as well as supervise the production of an animated adaptation of The Prophet. In May 2014, a work-in-progress version of The Prophet (2014) was screened at the Cannes Film Festival, and was given a limited release in August 2015.

Personal life
Allers married Leslee Hackenson in 1977. In March 2020, Allers filed for divorce from Hackenson. They have a daughter, Leah, and a son, Aidan.

Filmography

References

External links

 

1949 births
20th-century American male artists
20th-century American male writers
21st-century American male artists
21st-century American male writers
American animated film directors
American art directors
American male screenwriters
American storyboard artists
Animators from Arizona
Animators from California
Animators from New York (state)
Animation screenwriters
Arizona State University alumni
Film directors from Arizona
Film directors from Los Angeles
Film directors from New York (state)
Living people
People from Rye, New York
People from Venice, Los Angeles
Screenwriters from California
Screenwriters from New York (state)
Sony Pictures Animation people
Walt Disney Animation Studios people